Echinicola vietnamensis  is a heterotrophic and halotolerant bacterium from the genus of Echinicola which has been isolated from seawater from a musselfarm from the Nha Trang Bay in Vietnam.

References

External links
Type strain of Echinicola vietnamensis at BacDive -  the Bacterial Diversity Metadatabase	

Cytophagia
Bacteria described in 2007